St. Lazarus' Church may also refer to:

 St. Lazarus Roman Catholic Church, al-Eizariya, located near Tomb of Lazarus
 St. Lazarus' Church, Macau
 St. Lazarus' Church, Chennai
 St. Lazar's Church (Maribor)
 St Lazar's Church, Bournville
 Church of Saint Lazarus, Larnaca

See also
 Lazarus of Bethany